Malene Franzen (September 28, 1970 in Kastrup) is a Danish rhythmic gymnast.

Franzen competed for Denmark in the rhythmic gymnastics individual all-around competition at the 1988 Summer Olympics in Seoul. There she was 34th in the preliminary (qualification) round and did not advance to the final.

References

External links 
 Malene Franzen at Sports-Reference.com

1970 births
Living people
Danish rhythmic gymnasts
Gymnasts at the 1988 Summer Olympics
Olympic gymnasts of Denmark
People from Tårnby Municipality
Sportspeople from the Capital Region of Denmark